New Maradona or New Diego was a title given by the press and public to promising Argentine football players in reference (and reverence) to Diego Maradona as a benchmark. Since Maradona retired, people had been anticipating someone to lead the Argentina national team to a World Cup final, like Maradona did in 1986 and 1990. As a consequence, very talented youngsters were quickly labeled as the New Maradona (for example Lionel Messi or Juan Román Riquelme), sometimes without any similarity in playing style (such as Franco Di Santo). The New Maradonas were predominantly players in attacking or advanced playmaking roles — forwards, wingers, or attacking midfielders. The term gradually fell out of use after Lionel Messi successfully managed to lead Argentina to World Cup finals in 2014 and 2022, winning it in the latter, arguably emulating and surpassing Maradona to become the most successful Argentine footballer ever.

Lionel Messi 

In recent times the title 'New Maradona' was attached to Lionel Messi, an assertion supported by Maradona himself. Maradona and Messi worked together as manager and player for Argentina's national side at the 2010 World Cup, the former thoroughly impressed with the latter's skills.

On 18 April 2007, Messi scored a goal against Getafe CF, which was very similar to Maradona's Goal of the Century, scored against England in the 1986 World Cup. The world's sports press exploded with Maradona comparisons, and the Spanish press labeled Messi, “Messidona”. On 9 June 2007, in a match against RCD Espanyol, Messi scored a goal using his hand, which drew comparison to the Hand of God goal scored by Maradona in the same World Cup match. On 12 March 2013, Messi scored two goals, and helped create the fourth, to help Barcelona defeat A.C. Milan (4–0) in the 2nd leg of their Champions League game and reach the quarter-finals. Messi's opening goal of the match once again drew further comparisons between himself and Maradona, due to the similarity with Maradona's famous goal against Greece in the 1994 World Cup.

Messi has been compared to Maradona due to their similar playing style, skill set, and short stature. Their lower centre of gravity allows them to be more agile and change direction more quickly, helping them to evade tackles, and their short legs allow them to excel in short bursts of acceleration, and to keep control of the ball when dribbling at speed. Both players have played and worn the number 10 shirt for Barcelona and also for the Argentina national team, and like Maradona before him, Messi is also predominantly a left footed player. Messi's passing, dribbling, vision, eye for goal and playmaking ability have also drawn comparisons to Maradona. Like Maradona, Messi is also an accurate set piece and penalty kick taker. With regard to his dribbling ability and ball control, Maradona said of Messi: "The ball stays glued to his foot; I’ve seen great players in my career, but I’ve never seen anyone with Messi's ball control." Maradona stated that he believed Messi to currently be the greatest player in the world. Although Messi is regarded as being a more offensive player for Barcelona, he has also played in a more similar position to Maradona, in particular for Argentina, where he is predominantly used as an attacking midfielder, as a deep-lying forward, or as a winger, rather than as a striker or as a false-9. Like Maradona, Messi is considered to be one of the greatest players both of his generation and of all time.

Like Maradona, Messi won the FIFA World Youth Championship, in 2005 with Argentina, and won the Golden Ball. Coincidentally, both players made their national debut against Hungary, and Messi also went on to inherit Maradona's number 10 shirt and role as captain for Argentina. Messi would first wear the number 10 jersey and the captain's armband at an international tournament in the 2010 World Cup, under Maradona as coach. In 2014, Messi captained Argentina, leading them to their first World Cup final since Maradona had last brought them there as captain in 1990, where Argentina were once again defeated 1–0 by Germany. Like Maradona in 1986, Messi was awarded the Golden Ball as the tournament's best player, scoring four goals and providing an assist. With this achievement, Maradona and Messi are the only players to win the Golden Ball at both the FIFA U-20 World Cup and FIFA World Cup, with Maradona doing so in 1979 and 1986, while Messi managed the same feat in 2005 and in 2014. Like Maradona in 1986, Messi also made the most successful dribbling runs of any other player throughout the tournament, and knocked out Belgium on the way to the final, drawing further comparisons between the two players. During the tournament, Messi's passionate celebration after scoring the match winning goal against Bosnia and Herzegovina was compared to Maradona's famous goal celebration against Greece in 1994. Furthermore, images surfaced which compared the heavy marking both players faced by the opposition defence at the World Cup. Like Maradona again in 1986, Messi was involved in the vast majority of Argentina's goals.

In Argentina's final group match of the 2018 FIFA World Cup against Nigeria at the Krestovsky Stadium, Saint Petersburg on 26 June, Messi scored the opening goal in an eventual 2–1 victory, becoming the third Argentine after Diego Maradona and Gabriel Batistuta to score in three different World Cups. In the round of 16 match against France on 30 June, Messi set up Gabriel Mercado's and Sergio Agüero's goals in a 4–3 defeat, which saw Argentina eliminated from the World Cup. With his two assists in his team's second round fixture, Messi became the first player to provide two assists in a match for Argentina since Diego Maradona had managed the same feat against South Korea in 1986.

Messi would lead Argentina to a victory over hosts Brazil 1–0 in the 2021 Copa América final. This gave Messi his first major international title and Argentina's first since 1993. The win also marked his nation's joint record 15th Copa América overall, in a tournament that Maradona had never won. Messi was directly involved in 9 out of the 12 goals scored by Argentina, scoring four and assisting five; he was named the player of the tournament for his performances, an honour he shared with Neymar. He also finished as the tournament's top scorer with four goals tied with Colombia's Luis Díaz, with the Golden Boot awarded to Messi as he had more assists.

The 2022 FIFA World Cup saw Messi finally matching and arguably surpassing Maradona's achievement of winning the tournament after Argentina defeated France in the final in a 4–2 penalty shoot-out victory after a 3–3 draw in extra-time. He would tie Maradona's records for World Cup appearances (21) and goals (8) during a 2–0 group stage match against Mexico, and would finish the tournament as Argentina's leader in both. Having scored seven goals in seven games, Messi became the first player to score in each World Cup knockout round since the last-16 round was introduced in 1986. He also received the Golden Ball for player of the tournament, becoming the first player to win the award twice. It also marked Messi's fifth World Cup tournament, surpassing Maradona's four.

Initially, several pundits and footballing figures, including Maradona, questioned Messi's leadership with Argentina during the early and middle stages of his career, despite his playing ability, as Messi is a more aloof and quieter person than the more fiery and often controversial Maradona. Part of the criticism was based on the fact that he had not won an international trophy at senior level with Argentina, until he won his first in 2021 at Copa América. Football journalist Tim Vickery stated that Messi's perception among Argentines changed from 2019-2021, with Messi making a conscious effort to become "more one of the group, more Argentine", and after finally winning his first international silverware with the senior team, the 2021 Copa América, Argentina's first international trophy in three decades. Vickery added that following the World Cup victory in 2022, Messi would now be held in the same esteem as, and perhaps even higher than Maradona by his compatriots.

List of players once thought to be the "New Maradona"
 
Diego Latorre
Ariel Ortega
Marcelo Gallardo
Juan Román Riquelme
Pablo Aimar
Andrés D'Alessandro
Javier Saviola
Carlos Marinelli
Carlos Tevez
Ezequiel Lavezzi
Ángel Di María
Sergio Agüero
Franco di Santo
Paulo Dybala

References

Football in Argentina
Association football terminology
Honorary titles
Diego Maradona
Lionel Messi